Gary L. Boner (October 31, 1940 – May 16, 2005) was an American football player and coach.  He was the longest-tenured head football coach for South Dakota School of Mines & Technology (SDSM&T) in Rapid City, South Dakota, serving from 1971 to 1989. With a record of 92–73–7, he won more games than any football coach in SDSM&T history.

Playing career
As a player, Boner spent two seasons at SDSM&T before transferring to South Dakota State University (SDSU). At SDSU he was the leading rusher (497 yards) on the 1962 team that tied for the North Central Conference title. Counting receiving and kick/punt returns, he had more than 1,000 all-purpose yards that season. He was all-conference at both SDSM&T and SDSU. He graduated from SDSU with a B.S. in Mathematics and an M.S. in Physical Education. After graduation, he had a tryout with the Minnesota Vikings.

Coaching career
Boner started his coaching career as an assistant football and basketball coach at Rapid City High School (now Rapid City Central High School) in 1965. In 1969, he became the first head football coach at the new Rapid City Stevens High School, guiding the Raiders to a 6–3 record. He joined the staff at SDSM&T as an assistant football coach in 1970 and became the head coach in 1971.

Boner's teams were 73–32–4 in the South Dakota Intercollegiate Conference (SDIC) and won seven SDIC titles (1974, 1975, 1980, 1981, 1982, 1984, and 1985), the most in the school's history. His 1980 team was 8–1, while his 1978, 1981, 1982 and 1984 teams each won seven games. The SDSM&T Hardrockers won 13 games in a row over the 1980-81 seasons and reached the No. 3 rating in the National Association of Intercollegiate Athletics football poll in 1981. Boner led SDSM&T to 13 consecutive winning seasons from 1973 to 1985.

He was the NAIA District 12 Coach of the Year in 1980, and the South Dakota Sportswriters Association’s College Coach of the Year in 1981. He retired from coaching in 1990.

He was among the first inductees of the South Dakota School of Mines & Technology Sports Hall of Fame in 2004, and was posthumously inducted into the South Dakota Sports Hall of Fame in 2011.

Personal life
Boner married Linda Richtman on July 16, 1973 and had two sons. Following his retirement from football in 1990, he taught mathematics at Central High School from 1991 until his retirement in 1997. 

An avid golfer since his 20s, Boner recorded five holes-in-one over his lifetime.

He died in Rapid City on May 16, 2005 at the age of 64.

Head coaching record

College

References

1940 births
2005 deaths
South Dakota Mines Hardrockers football coaches
South Dakota State Jackrabbits football players
High school basketball coaches in South Dakota
High school football coaches in South Dakota
People from Hot Springs, South Dakota
Players of American football from South Dakota